"Flower of Scotland" is a Scottish song, frequently performed at special occasions and sporting events as an unofficial national anthem of Scotland.

The song was composed in the mid-1960s by Roy Williamson of the folk group the Corries. It was first heard publicly in a 1967 BBC television series. The words refer to the victory of the Scots, led by Robert I, over Edward II of England at the Battle of Bannockburn in 1314. Although there is no official national anthem of Scotland, "Flower of Scotland" is one of a number of songs which are used, along with the older "Scotland the Brave".

The song was composed and is sung in English, with one Scots word ("Tae" for "To"). It has been translated into Scots.

Popular use
The song has been used as an anthem by the Scotland rugby union team, ever since the winger, Billy Steele, encouraged his team-mates to sing it on the British Lions tour of South Africa in 1974. The song was adopted as the pre-game anthem for the 1990 Five Nations Championship, first non-officially for the initial home game against France, then for the deciding match between Scotland and England at Murrayfield, which Scotland won 13–7 to win the Grand Slam. The Scottish Football Association adopted "Flower of Scotland" as its pre-game national anthem in 1997 although it was first used by them in 1993. Usually only the first and third verses are sung. The most common shouted interjections are "'Gainst who?" and "Bastards".

The song was used as the victory anthem of Team Scotland at the Commonwealth Games in 2010, replacing "Scotland the Brave". This trend continued to the Commonwealth Games in 2014 where it was again Team Scotland's anthem and was sung following a Scottish gold medal. It was sung four times when Team Scotland won four gold medals in the opening day.

In July 2006, the Royal Scottish National Orchestra conducted an online poll (publicised by Reporting Scotland) in which voters could choose a national anthem from one of five candidates. 10,000 people took part in the poll, in which "Flower of Scotland" came out the winner with 41% of the votes.

At the 2012 Summer Olympics opening ceremony, the song was sung at Edinburgh Castle by 53 Scottish children selected from schools across Scotland.

Paris Saint-Germain fans sing the chant "Ô Ville Lumière" ("City of Light") to the tune of Flower of Scotland.

References

External links
 The Flower of Scotland – Translation of lyrics into Scots Gaelic.
 Page with eight National Anthem candidate songs, with lyrics and comments

Flower of Scotland, The
National symbols of Scotland
Scotland national rugby union team
Scotland national football team songs
National anthem compositions in E-flat major
Robert the Bruce
1967 songs